Triton class may refer to:

 The Royal Navy's T class (or Triton class) of diesel-electric submarines designed in the 1930s to replace the O, P and R classes. 
 A proposed but ultimately un-built class of United States Navy nuclear-powered radar picket submarines, numbering between four and eight units, with  serving as the intended lead ship and ultimately was the only ship of her type to be authorized for construction.
 Triton-class container ship, a class of large container ships.
 Triton-class cruise ship, and upcoming class of ships for Disney Cruise Line